The Easy Way Out (French title: L'Art de la fugue) is a 2014 French comedy-drama film directed by Brice Cauvin, based on the novel The Easy Way Out by Stephen McCauley, which was published in French as L'Art de la fugue.

The plot concerns three brothers: Antoine is gay, in his mid-30s, and lives with his boyfriend Adar; Louis, the youngest, is having an affair while engaged to his high school sweetheart; and Gérard, the oldest, has separated from his wife and works for his parents in their slowly failing clothing store. Antoine introduces his friend Ariel into this family dynamic just as each of the brothers tries to come to terms with his failed or strained relationship.

Cast 
 Laurent Lafitte as Antoine
 Agnès Jaoui as Ariel
 Benjamin Biolay as Gérard 
 Nicolas Bedos as Louis
 Bruno Putzulu as Adar
 Élodie Frégé as Julie
 Guy Marchand as Francis
 Marie-Christine Barrault as Nelly
 Didier Flamand as Chastenet
 Alice Belaïdi as Franette
 Irène Jacob as Mathilde
 Arthur Igual as Alexis

References

External links 
 

2014 films
2014 comedy-drama films
2010s French-language films
French comedy-drama films
2014 LGBT-related films
French LGBT-related films
Films shot in Paris
Films shot in Brussels
Films based on American novels
French independent films
2014 independent films
LGBT-related comedy-drama films
2010s French films